Principal R. Snyder is a fictional character in the television series Buffy the Vampire Slayer, played by Armin Shimerman. Shimerman originally auditioned for the role of Principal Flutie, but lost that role to Ken Lerner. Although his full name is never revealed in the series, his desk name-display revealed that the first letter of his first name is R.

Summary
After Robert Flutie is eaten alive by "the Pack" (with the exception of Xander), Snyder replaces him as the principal of Sunnydale High. A strict disciplinarian with a dictator-like personality, he has few friends among the students, except the swim team. Despite or because of his view of adolescents as hormone-ridden pests, he follows his profession out of a sense of civic duty ("When She Was Bad"). Snyder takes an immediate and profound dislike to Buffy, and seeks out any excuse to expel her. He coerces students into serving as chaperones for young children on Halloween, bullies Willow into tutoring Percy and makes her give a passing grade to a swim team member who is failing computer class, and forces everyone to sell candy for the marching band.

Snyder (along with Police Chief Bob Munroe) turns out to be one of the many people Mayor Richard Wilkins had put in place to cover up supernatural activities in Sunnydale ("School Hard", "I Only Have Eyes For You"), and he was hostile towards Buffy because Wilkins had so ordered him. According to the later episode, Snyder was specifically chosen as principal because the authorities believed he was uniquely suited for the job's equally unique pressures, but precisely what in Snyder's past might have so qualified him was never discussed. The only insight into Snyder's past was his Band Candy-induced regression to adolescence, where he is a socially inept geek without an obvious understanding of the supernatural.

Snyder finally expels Buffy when she is found beside Kendra's body in the season two finale. He refuses to allow her to return even after Buffy is cleared of all charges, citing Buffy's poor grades, spotty attendance record, and "tingling pleasure" that he is finally rid of her. However, the school board, as well as physical and professional threats from Rupert Giles, force him to allow Buffy to return.

Snyder's stern belief in imposing order and discipline proves to be his undoing in the season three finale, "Graduation Day". He loudly scolds Mayor Wilkins for turning into the gigantic, snakelike demon Olvikan following his keynote speech at the 1999 high school graduation. Olvikan swallows Snyder whole.

Snyder makes one more appearance in the role of Colonel Kurtz in Xander's Apocalypse Now-themed dream in the season four finale "Restless".

Four years later, after Sunnydale High School is rebuilt, Robin Wood succeeded Snyder as the school's principal. Even three and a half years after Snyder's death, Willow says Wood is so much cooler than Snyder, indicating she still dislikes him.

Appearances
Buffy the Vampire Slayer: Snyder appeared in 19 episodes 
Season 1 (1997) – "The Puppet Show", "Out of Mind, Out of Sight".
Season 2 (1997, 1998) – "When She Was Bad"; "School Hard"; "Halloween"; "What's My Line, Part One"; "I Only Have Eyes For You"; "Go Fish"; "Becoming, Part One"; "Becoming, Part Two". 
Season 3 (1998, 1999) – "Dead Man's Party"; "Faith, Hope & Trick"; "Band Candy"; "Gingerbread"; "Doppelgangland"; "Choices"; "Graduation Day, Part One"; "Graduation Day, Part Two"
Season 4 (1999, 2000) – "Restless"

Notes and references

Buffy the Vampire Slayer characters
Fictional characters from California
Television characters introduced in 1997
Fictional principals and headteachers
Male characters in television
American male characters in television